W. Morgan Petty is the creation of  Brian Bethell. W. Morgan Petty would write crank letters to numerous organizations expressing typical concerns for mid-1980s Britain like nuclear war and the common market. Collections of his letters include:

 The Defence Diaries of W. Morgan Petty (1985)
 European Entries: the Common Market Papers of W. Morgan Petty (1986)

See also
Henry Root

Hoaxers
English satirists